The Lecrin Valley is a comarca in the center-south part of the province of Granada, Andalusia, southern Spain. This territory borders the Vega de Granada to the north, the Alpujarra Granadina to the east, the Costa Tropical to the south, and the Alhama to the west.

Lecrin derived from Arabic Iqlim, meaning "gateway": this refers to a small area of land situated between the villages of Mondújar and Talará, which controlled the access to the vast coastal areas of sugar production in Moorish times.

The Lecrin Valley consists of eight municipalities, of which the most populous is El Padul, and the largest is Albuñuelas, the latter being also the least populated. On the other hand, the municipality with the smallest area is Villamena. Its traditional and historical capital is the town of Dúrcal.

Apart from Dúrcal and Padul, agriculture and farming remain the principal occupation with pine, citrus, almond, olive and grape as the main crops. In more recent times, it has become a destination for Spanish and international holidaymakers looking for a quiet holiday amongst the orchards, but with easy reach to the Moorish city of Granada and the Costa Tropical. It is also an increasingly popular destination for walkers, bird watchers, cyclists and artists.

The Lecrin Valley is known for its verdant landscape (due to the melt-water run off from Sierra Nevada) and its views to lake Beznar and up to the Sierra Nevada mountains, its walks, birdlife and spring colours.

Municipalities 
This comarca consists of the following municipalities:

Road access 

Halfway between the city of Granada and the Costa Tropical, this comarca is traversed from North to South by the A-44 (Bailén-Motril) motorway, which serves all municipalities with the following ways out:

 144: El Padul, Otívar.
 153: Cónchar, Cozvíjar, Dúrcal, Albuñuelas.
 157: Dúrcal, Nigüelas.
 159: Lecrín, El Valle.
 164: Pinos del Valle, Lanjarón, Béznar
 169: Ízbor-Acebuches.

Other notable roads are: N-323, an old road that connected Bailén with Motril, connecting the cities of Jaén and Granada with the coast; A-4050, popularly known as Carretera de la Cabra, which links the mountain port of El Suspiro del Moro with Almuñécar to the west; and A-348, which connects the entire Alpujarra Granadina with the highway.

Comarcas of the Province of Granada
Valleys of Spain
Landforms of Andalusia